The 2004 French Grand Prix (officially the Formula 1 Mobil 1 Grand Prix de France 2004) was a Formula One motor race held on 4 July 2004 at the Circuit de Nevers Magny-Cours. It was Race 10 of 18 in the 2004 FIA Formula One World Championship. This race has become famous for a 4 stop strategy used by Michael Schumacher to beat Fernando Alonso's Renault. Rubens Barrichello finished third in his Ferrari, having overtaken Jarno Trulli in the last corners of the last lap.

Friday drivers
The bottom six teams in the 2003 Constructors' Championship were entitled to run a third car in free practice on Friday. These drivers drove on Friday but did not compete in qualifying or the race.

Classification

Qualifying

Race

Championship standings after the race 
Bold text indicates who still has a theoretical chance of becoming World Champion.

Drivers' Championship standings

Constructors' Championship standings

Note: Only the top five positions are included for both sets of standings.

References

French Grand Prix
French Grand Prix
Grand Prix
Grand Prix